Catarina de Sousa Lobo Martins Portas (Lisbon, 1969) is a Portuguese journalist and businesswoman.

Biography  
She is the daughter of the architect Nuno Portas and of his second wife, Margarida Maria Gomes de Sousa Lobo and half sister of the politicians Miguel Portas and Paulo Portas.
Catarina became a journalist in 1988 and worked on the radio (Correio da Manhã Rádio and Rádio Comercial) and on television, firstly in RTP (Onda Curta, Falatório, Raios e Coriscos and Frou Frou), and then in SIC.
Since 2004, she became a businesswoman, with the inauguration of the A Vida Portuguesa stores, dedicated to the reselling of vintage Portuguese brands.
In December 2009, she was nominated by Monocle magazine as one of the twenty worldwide names that deserve "a bigger stage".

References

1969 births
Living people
Portuguese women journalists
Portuguese women in business
Women television journalists
Women radio journalists
Portuguese television journalists
Portuguese radio journalists
Portuguese radio presenters
Portuguese women radio presenters
20th-century journalists
21st-century journalists
21st-century Portuguese businesspeople
21st-century businesswomen
People from Lisbon